A hackathon (also known as a hack day, hackfest, datathon or codefest; a portmanteau of hacking and marathon) is an event where people engage in rapid and collaborative engineering over a relatively short period of time such as 24 or 48 hours. They are often run using agile software development practices, such as sprint-like design wherein computer programmers and others involved in software development, including graphic designers, interface designers, product managers, project managers, domain experts, and others collaborate intensively on engineering projects, such as software engineering.

The goal of a hackathon is to create functioning software or hardware by the end of the event. Hackathons tend to have a specific focus, which can include the programming language used, the operating system, an application, an API, or the subject and the demographic group of the programmers. In other cases, there is no restriction on the type of software being created or the design of the new system.

Etymology
The word "hackathon" is a portmanteau of the words "hack" and "marathon", where "hack" is used in the sense of exploratory programming, not its alternate meaning as a reference to breaching computer security.

OpenBSD's apparent first use of the term referred to a cryptographic development event held in Calgary on June 4, 1999, where ten developers came together to avoid legal problems caused due to export regulations of cryptographic software from the United States.  Since then, a further three to six events per year have occurred around the world to advance development, generally on university campuses.

For Sun Microsystems, the usage referred to an event at the JavaOne conference from June 15 to June 19, 1999; there John Gage challenged attendees to write a program in Java for the new Palm V using the infrared port to communicate with other people who are using Palm and register it on the Internet.

Starting in the mid to late 2000s, hackathons became significantly more widespread and began to be increasingly viewed by companies and venture capitalists as a way to quickly develop new software technologies, and to locate new areas for innovation and funding. Some major companies were born from these hackathons, such as GroupMe, which began as a project at a hackathon at the TechCrunch Disrupt 2010 conference; in 2011 it was acquired by Skype for $85 million. The software PhoneGap began as a project at the iPhoneDevCamp (later renamed iOSDevCamp) in 2008; the company whose engineers developed PhoneGap, Nitobi, refocused itself around PhoneGap, and Nitobi was bought by Adobe in 2011 for an undisclosed amount.

Structure
Hackathons typically start with communication via a presentation or a web page from the hosting organization that mentions the objectives, terms, and details of the  hackathon. Developers register to participate in the hackathon and are qualified after the organization screens their background and skills.

When the hackathon event begins, the participating individuals or teams start their programming work. The administrator of the hackathon is typically able to answer questions and offer help when their issues come up in the event.

Hackathons can last several hours to several days. For hackathons that last 24 hours or longer, especially competitive ones, eating is often informal, with participants often subsisting on food like pizza and energy drinks. Sometimes sleeping is informal as well, with participants sleeping on-site with sleeping bags.

At the end of hackathons, there are usually a series of demonstrations in which each group presents their results. To capture the great ideas and work-in-progress often people post a video of the demonstrations, blog about results with screenshots and details, share links and progress on social media, suggest a place for open source code and generally make it possible for people to share, learn from and possibly build from the ideas generated and initial work completed.

There is sometimes a contest element as well, in which a panel of judges select the winning teams, and prizes are given. At many hackathons, the judges are made up of organisers and sponsors. At BarCamp-style hackathons, that are organised by the development community, such as iOSDevCamp, the judges are usually made up of peers and colleagues in the field. Such prizes are sometimes a substantial amount of money: a social gaming hackathon at the TechCrunch Disrupt conference offered $250,000 in funding to the winners, while a controversial 2013 hackathon run by Salesforce.com had a payout of $1 million to the winners, billed as the largest-ever prize.

Types of hackathons

For an application type
Some hackathons focus on a particular platform such as mobile apps, a desktop operating system, web development or video game development.

Mobile app hackathons like Over the Air, held at Phoenix Park, Ireland, can see a large amount of corporate sponsorship and interest.

Music Hack Day, a hackathon for music-related software and hardware applications, is a popular event, having been held over 30 times around the world since 2009. Also Music Tech Fest, a three-day interdisciplinary festival for music ideas bringing together musicians with hackers, researchers and industry, features a hackathon. Similarly, Science Hack Day, a hackathon for making things with science, has been held over 45 times in over 15 countries around the world since 2010.

Hackathons have been held to develop applications that run on various mobile device operating systems, such as Android, iOS and MeeGo. Hackathons have also been held to develop video-based applications and computer games. Hackathons where video games are developed are sometimes called game jams.

"TV Hackfest" events have been held in both London and San Francisco, focusing mainly on social television and second screen technologies. In TV Hackfests, challenge briefs are typically submitted by content producers and brands, in the form of broadcast industry metadata or video content, while sponsors supply APIs, SDKs and pre-existing open source software code.

Hackathons have also been used in the life sciences to advance the informatics infrastructure that supports research. The Open Bioinformatics Foundation ran two hackathons for its member projects in 2002 and 2003, and since 2010 has held 2-day "codefests" preceding its annual conference. The National Evolutionary Synthesis Center has co-organized and sponsored hackathons for evolutionary bioinformatics since 2006.  BioHackathon is an annual event that started in 2008 targeted at advancing standards to enable interoperable bioinformatics tools and Web services. Neuroscientists have also used hackathons to bring developers and scientists together to address issues that range from focusing on a specific information system (e.g., Neurosynth Hackathon and the Allen Brain Atlas Hackathon) and providing reserved time for broad scientific inquiry (e.g., Brainhack), to using specific challenges that focus hacking activity (e.g., HBM Hackathon).

There has been an emergence of 'datathons' or data-focused hackathons in recent years. These events challenge data scientists working with others attending to together use creativity and data analysis skills and platforms to build, test and explore solutions and dashboards which analyse huge datasets in a limited amount of time. These are increasingly being used to deliver insights in big public and private datasets in various disciplines including business, health care news media and for social causes.

Using a specific programming language, API, or framework
There have been hackathons devoted to creating applications that use a specific language or framework, like JavaScript, Node.js, HTML5 and Ruby on Rails.

Some hackathons focus on applications that make use of the application programming interface, or API, from a single company or data source. Open Hack, an event run publicly by Yahoo! since 2006 (originally known as "Hack Day", then "Open Hack Day"), has focused on usage of the Yahoo! API, in addition to APIs of websites owned by Yahoo!, like Flickr. The company's Open Hack India event in 2012 had over 700 attendees. Google has run similar events for their APIs, as has the travel guide company Lonely Planet.

The website Foursquare notably held a large, global hackathon in 2011, in which over 500 developers at over 30 sites around the world competed to create applications using the Foursquare API. A second Foursquare hackathon, in 2013, had around 200 developers. The IETF organizes Hackathons for each IETF meetings which are focused on IETF Internet Draft and IETF RFC implementation for better inter-operability and improved Internet Standards.

For a cause or purpose
There have been a number of hackathons devoted to improving government, and specifically to the cause of open government. One such event, in 2011, was hosted by the United States Congress. Starting in 2012, NASA has been annually hosting the International Space Apps Challenge.

In 2014, the British government and HackerNest ran DementiaHack, the world's first hackathon dedicated to improving the lives of people living with dementia and their caregivers. The series continues in 2015, adding the Canadian government and Facebook as major sponsors.

The Global Game Jam, the largest video game development hackathon, often includes optional requirements called 'diversifiers' that aim to promote game accessibility and other causes.

VanHacks is an annual hackathon that is part of Vancouver Startup Week. The focus of the hackathon is creating solutions for local non-profit organizations from the Vancouver area over the course of 36 hours. VanHacks was created in 2016 by TTT Studios.

Various hackathons have been held to improve city transit systems. Hackathons aimed at improvements to city local services are increasing, with one of the London Councils (Hackney) creating a number of successful local solutions with a two-day Hackney-thon. There have also been a number of hackathons devoted to improving education, including Education Hack Day and on a smaller scale, looking specifically at the challenges of field work based geography education, the Field Studies Council hosted FSCHackday. Random Hacks of Kindness is another popular hackathon, devoted to disaster management and crisis response.
ThePort instead is a hackathon devoted to solving humanitarian, social and public interest challenges. It's hosted by CERN with partners from other non-governmental organizations such as ICRC and UNDP.

In March 2020, numerous world-wide initiatives led by entrepreneurs and governmental representatives from European countries resulted in a series of anti-crisis hackathons Hack the Crisis, with first to happen in Estonia, followed up by Poland, Latvia, and Ukraine. Beginning in 2020, the Michal Sela Forum has run hackathons to develop technology to help prevent domestic violence.

As a tribute or a memorial
A number of hackathons around the world have been planned in memory of computer programmer and internet activist Aaron Swartz, who died in 2013.

For a demographic group
Some hackathons are intended only for programmers within a certain demographic group, like teenagers, college students, or women.

Hackathons at colleges have become increasingly popular, in the United States and elsewhere. These are usually annual or semiannual events that are open to college students at all universities. They are often competitive, with awards provided by the University or programming-related sponsors. Many of them are supported by the organization Major League Hacking, which was founded in 2013 to assist with the running of collegiate hackathons.

PennApps at the University of Pennsylvania was the first student-run college hackathon; in 2015 it became the largest college hackathon with its 12th iteration hosting over 2000 people and offering over $60k in prizes. The University of Mauritius Computer Club and Cyberstorm.mu organized a Hackathon dubbed "Code Wars" focused on implementing an IETF RFC in Lynx in 2017.

ShamHacks at Missouri University of Science and Technology is held annually as an outreach activity of the campus's Curtis Laws Wilson Library. ShamHacks 2018 focused on problem statements to better quality of life factors for US veterans, by pairing with veteran-owned company sponsors.

For internal innovation and motivation
Some companies hold internal hackathons to promote new product innovation by the engineering staff. For example, Facebook's Like button was conceived as part of a hackathon.

To connect local tech communities
Some hackathons (such as StartupBus, founded in 2010 in Australia) combine the competitive element with a road trip, to connect local tech communities in multiple cities along the bus routes. This is now taking place across North America, Europe, Africa and Australasia.

Code sprints

In some hackathons, all work is on a single application, such as an operating system, programming language, or content management system. Such events are often known as "code sprints", and are especially popular for open source software projects, where such events are sometimes the only opportunity for developers to meet face-to-face.

Code sprints typically last from one week to three weeks and often take place near conferences at which most of the team attend. Unlike other hackathons, these events rarely include a competitive element.

The annual hackathon to work on the operating system OpenBSD, held since 1999, is one such event; it may have originated the word "hackathon".

Criticism
Over the years hackathons have come under severe criticism, with multiple observers questioning the adequacy of hackathons to deliver impactful technological solutions. A major part of the reserve towards hackathons has to do with the lack of viability and sustainability of solutions they develop, as clearly shown by recent empirical research. A study examining 11,889 U.S. based events revealed that only seven percent of projects had any activity six months after the hackathon ended. Another global study found that only about five percent of all projects developed during hackathons continued for more than five months. Hackathons have been thus associated with the production of short-lived software products often denominated as vaporware. Hackathons have been equally criticized for their failure to contemplate the complexity of issues that they seek to solve, developing technologies that do not address underlining societal and political causes of a problem. The use of hackathon participants as de facto unpaid laborers by some commercial ventures has been criticized as exploitative.

High-profile hackathons have also been the object of controversies.  A team at the September 2013 TechCrunch Disrupt Hackathon presented the TitStare app, which allowed users to post and view pictures of men staring at women's cleavage.  TechCrunch issued an apology later that day. A November 2013 hackathon run by Salesforce.com, billed as having the largest-ever grand prize at $1 million, was accused of impropriety after it emerged that the winning entrants, a two-person startup called Upshot, had been developing the technology that they demoed for over a year and that one of the two was a former Salesforce employee. Major League Hacking expelled a pair of hackers from the September 2015 hackathon Hack the North at the University of Waterloo for making jokes that were interpreted as bomb threats, leading many hackers to criticize the organization. As a result of the controversy, Victor Vucicevich resigned from the Hack the North organizing team.

Notable events 

 MHacks
 HackMIT
 Junction (hackathon)
 HackTX

See also

 Game Jam
 Installfest
 Editathon
 Charrette
 Startup Weekend
 Campus Party
 Capture the flag (cybersecurity)

References

External links

 
"Demystifying the hackathon". Article from Mckinsey, October, 2015

Hacker culture
Internet slang
OpenBSD
Software developer communities
Software development events